Azerbaijan sent a team to compete at the 2008 Summer Olympics in Beijing, China. In total 44 Azerbaijani athletes went to Beijing, including 14 women.

Medalists

| width="78%" align="left" valign="top" |

| width="22%" align="left" valign="top" |

Competitors

Athletics

Key
 Note – Ranks given for track events are within the athlete's heat only
 Q = Qualified for the next round
 q = Qualified for the next round as a fastest loser or, in field events, by position without achieving the qualifying target
 NR = National record
 N/A = Round not applicable for the event
 Bye = Athlete not required to compete in round

Men

Boxing

Equestrian

Show jumping

Gymnastics

Rhythmic

Judo

Men

Women

Shooting

Women

Swimming

Men

Women

Taekwondo

Weightlifting

Wrestling

Key
  - Victory by Fall.
  - Decision by Points - the loser with technical points.
  - Decision by Points - the loser without technical points.

Men's freestyle

Men's Greco-Roman

Women's freestyle

See also
 Azerbaijan at the 2008 Summer Paralympics

Nations at the 2008 Summer Olympics
2008
2008 in Azerbaijani sport